Zeishan Quadri is an Indian writer, actor, director and producer who wrote the story and co-wrote the screenplay for the Bollywood crime genre film Gangs of Wasseypur, directed by Anurag Kashyap. Quadri has also acted in Gangs of Wasseypur - Part 2. He has directed and produced the film Meeruthiya Gangsters.

Early life
Zeishan Quadri was born in Wasseypur, Dhanbad, Bihar (now in Jharkhand) in 1983. He is the only son and the youngest child of Syed Imran Quadri, a civil engineer. Quadri grew up in a strict and protective environment. He has two elder sisters. Quadri was educated in Dhanbad. Quadri left Dhanbad to study for Bachelor of Arts (BA) from Meerut. Quadri worked in a call center and for HCL computers in Delhi for 18 months before coming to Mumbai in 2008.

Film career
In 2009, Quadri moved to Mumbai to pursue a career in acting. Quadri studied world cinema including film makers such as Majid Majidi, Fateh Akın and Akira Kurosawa. Quadri has worked in the genre of Bollywood crime films. His film Revolver Rani was directed by Sai Kabir and starred Kangana Ranaut and vir Das.
His first film as a director and producer was Meeruthiya Gangsters. The editing of the film has been done by veteran filmmaker  Anurag Kashyap who presented the film along with Prateek Entertainment Pvt. Ltd. Quadri visited many cities for the promotion of the film including Aligarh at Aligarh Muslim University.

Projects 
In 2014, Quadri acted in a movie directed by Vipin Sharma and produced by Bohra bros, as well as a negative lead in the upcoming movie Banana directed by Sajid Ali, produced by John Abraham Entertainment. He is also working on a script with Madhur Bhandarkar for his upcoming movie Madamji starring Priyanka Chopra. He has written a script Oh Womaniya for Pritish Nandy Communications to be helmed by Anu Menon, and a script for Fardeen Khan Productions tentatively titled Firauti.

According to Mumbai Mirror, Anurag Kashyap and Quadri are collaborating on the third installment of the Gangs of Wasseypur franchise, with Kashyap insisting that Quadri writes and directs the film. Quadri initially planned to produce Sarbjit, and brought in Omung Kumar, who directed the film released in 2016. Quadri and Ekta Kapoor are collaborating on a new non-fiction TV series.

Awards

Honours

 Jury member at the 8th Filmsaaz.

Gangs of Wasseypur 2
"Gangs of Wasseypur" is based on real life events in the coal rich city of Dhanbad. It is a story about the "coal mafia" that spans several generations from 1941 to 2010 in two parts. On 30 May 2009, Quadri's story was sold to Anurag Kashyap. Quadri negotiated to write the script and play the character "Definite" in the second part.

Filmography

Films

Web series

Awards and nominations

References

External links 
 

1983 births
Living people
Indian male film actors
Indian male screenwriters
Male actors from Bihar
People from Dhanbad district
Male actors from Jharkhand
De Nobili Schools alumni
Screenwriters from Bihar